The Philharmonie de Paris is a complex of concert halls in Paris, France. The buildings also house exhibition spaces and rehearsal rooms. The main buildings are all located in the Parc de la Villette at the northeastern edge of Paris in the 19th arrondissement. At the core of this set of spaces is the symphonic concert hall of 2,400 seats designed by Jean Nouvel and opened in January 2015. Its construction had been postponed for about twenty years to complete the current musical institution la Cité de la Musique designed by Christian de Portzamparc and opened in 1995.

Mainly dedicated to symphonic concerts, the Philharmonie de Paris also present other forms of music such as jazz and world music.

Plans
The project was announced on 6 March 2006, by the Minister of Culture and Communication, Renaud Donnedieu de Vabres, the Mayor of Paris, Bertrand Delanoë, and the Director of the Cité de la musique and of the Salle Pleyel, Laurent Bayle, during a press conference on the reopening of the Salle Pleyel, now linked with the Cité de la Musique.
In 2007, Jean Nouvel won the design competition for the auditorium. He brought in Brigitte Métra as his partner, along with Marshall Day Acoustics (room acoustics design), Nagata Acoustics (peer-review and scale model study) and dUCKS Scéno (scenography).

The cost of construction, expected to be €170 million, was shared by the national government (45 per cent), the Ville de Paris (45 per cent), and the Région Île-de-France (10 per cent), but the final cost was around €386 million ($ million)

Opening ceremony
The hall opened on 14 January 2015, with a performance by the Orchestre de Paris of Faure's Requiem, conducted by Paavo Järvi, played to honour the victims of the Charlie Hebdo shootings which had taken place in the city a week earlier. It is located in the Parc de la Villette in the 19th arrondissement of Paris. This sector of the city was also the home of the two brothers who carried out these killings. The opening concert was attended by French President François Hollande, but boycotted by the architect.

Philharmonie 1 

Philharmonie 1 (part of the Philharmonie de Paris), a new 2400-seat symphony hall, is a project whose construction had been postponed for about twenty years, to complete the Cité de la Musique.

On 6 March 2006 the French minister of Culture and communication Renaud Donnedieu de Vabres, the mayor of Paris Bertrand Delanoë, and the director of the Cité de la Musique, Laurent Bayle, announced the beginning of the construction at a press conference concerning the reopening of the Salle Pleyel, now associated with the Museum.

In April 2007, the renowned architect Jean Nouvel won the design competition for the building. He brought in Brigitte Métra as his partner, along with Marshall Day Acoustics (room acoustics design) and Nagata Acoustics (peer-review and scale model study).

The cost of construction was expected to be 170 million euros, and was shared by the national government (45 per cent), the Ville de Paris (45 per cent), and the Région Île-de-France (10 per cent). In the end, the cost amounted to €386 million and the building was delivered two years after the intended date.

The hall opened on 14 January 2015 with a performance by the Orchestre de Paris of Fauré's Requiem to honour the victims of the Charlie Hebdo shootings, which had taken place in the city a week earlier. The opening concert was attended by François Hollande, the President of France, but not by Jean Nouvel, because of an ongoing dispute about the final costs and date of the building's completion.

The acoustic and architectural characteristics of the main concert hall have been described as "retaining a real sense of intimacy. This is achieved by various floating balconies that enable even the farthest spectator to be only 36 yards away from the conductor."

The first season of the Philharmonie de Paris started in January 2015. The purpose of the season was to reach out to new audiences by providing musical creation and a varied repertory in classical music, dance, jazz, world music and contemporary music. On weekends, a diverse program of affordably-priced events and activities was offered each with a theme (such as the Love Stories weekend in February, David Bowie in early March or Paco de Lucia tribute weekend in May).

Philharmonie 2

This used to be called Cité de la Musique and consists of:
an amphitheatre
a concert hall seating 800–1,000
a museum of classical music instruments dating from the 15th to the 20th centuries
a music library
exhibition halls and
workshops

Organ
The Philharmonie de Paris contracted the Austrian organ-maker Rieger Orgelbau to construct a pipe organ. It is made up of 6,055 pipes with 91 stops and was designed to complement the building's architecture. The organ debuted with a concert on 28 October 2015, with an improvisation by Thierry Escaich and a performance of Symphony No. 3 (Saint-Saëns). Another organ of 53 stops on 3 manuals and pedals had already been built in 1991 by the same firm for the nearby Conservatoire de Paris (CNSMDP).

References

External links

 
 Philharmonie de Paris  at Google Cultural Institute
  1:10 acoustic model of the Philharmonie de Paris

Concert halls in France
Music venues in Paris
Jean Nouvel buildings
Buildings and structures in the 19th arrondissement of Paris
Music venues in France